Antonio Velázquez Bautista (born 1981) is a Spanish actor.

Biography 
Antonio Velázquez Bautista was born in 1981 in Granada. He studied to become a sub-officer in the Spanish Armed Forces, but he switched to acting in 1999.

The first decade of his acting career featured credits in supporting and guest roles in TV series such as Arrayán, SMS: Sin Miedo a Soñar, Aída, Matrimonio con hijos, Mesa para cinco and Cuenta atrás. He landed a starring role in the ensemble cast of the comedy series ¡A ver si llego!, aired on Telecinco in 2009, performing the role of Mike, a "seductive" fishmonger. He earned early public recognition performing the lead role of Paquirri in the biopic telefilm of the same name, also broadcast in 2009. He earned further popularity for his role as Aníbal Bravo in Tierra de lobos. He has later appeared in series such as Hermanos, Cable Girls, and Traición.

Filmography 

Television

Film

References 

1981 births
21st-century Spanish male actors
Spanish male film actors
Spanish male television actors
Male actors from Andalusia
Living people